Faughs GAA Club is a Gaelic Athletic Association (GAA) hurling and camogie club in Templeogue, Dublin, Ireland. They have won 31 titls.

History

Faughs GAA Club was founded in Easter 1885, "under the big tree" in the Phoenix Park in Dublin. Its inaugural meeting was held at 4 Gardiner's Row, home of Michael Cusack (now the Dergvale Hotel). The club name, Faughs, is derived from the Irish language slogan, meaning "clear the way," a battle cry used by ancient Irish warriors.

When the Dublin County Board was formed in 1886, Larry O'Toole was on the committee. At this time Faughs, wearing colours amber and black played both hurling and football, took part in the first Dublin championships in 1887, and were winners of the Dublin Senior Football Championship in 1889.

In January 1891, Faughs merged with the "Davitts" who, like Faughs, were mostly "spirit grocers assistants". As "Faughs–Davitts" in colours amber, black and blue, they won their first Dublin senior hurling championship in 1892, and were beaten by Redmonds of Cork in the All-Ireland final in an unfinished match. The Faughs–Davitts coalition declined after that, as indeed did most clubs at the time due to the Parnell split.

In 1895, a member of the original Faughs club—Pat Cullen, who was destined to lend invaluable aid to the spread of native games in Dublin—revived and reorganised the club with the assistance of Tim Gleeson, Jack Cleary and Tom Hogan, who were also members of the original club. After 1895, Faughs became a hurling-only club and adopted the colours of saffron and green, which it has kept to the present day.

The early years of the 20th century proved to be successful for the club, which won the first four senior championships–four in a row, 1900–1904—and another five before 1920. Big names during this period were Jack and Jimmy Cleary, Danny McCormack, Andy Harty, and Jack and Will Connolly. Playing at fullback on the team that won the 1914 and 1915 championships was Harry Boland, known for his part in the 1916 Rising, War of Independence and Civil War.

The four in a row was achieved again in 1920–1923. The best year of all was 1920 when they won the Senior Championship and League, Intermediate Championship and League. The team led by Bob Mockler, the greatest midfielder of his time, captured the All-Ireland Senior Hurling Championship title beating Cork in the final by six points. The final score was 4–9 to 4–3.

Included in this team were Jim "Builder" Walsh, the only man selected on all three Tailteann Games Ireland teams, Tommy Moore, Mick Neville, Martin Hayes, Tom Hayes, Jimmy Cleary, Ned Tobin, Bob Doherty and John Joe Callanan who would later captain Tipperary to beat Dublin in the 1930 All-Ireland final.

The next great era was from 1939 to 1952, when eight championships were won, including two threes-in-a-row, 1939–1941 and 1944–1946. These teams included many prominent inter-county and inter-provincial players, including the gifted and stylish Harry Grey, Ned Wade, Phil Farrell, Mick Butler, Terry Leahy, Mick Gill, Jim Mullane, Martin Quinn, Dan Canniffe, Charlie Downes, Jim Egan, Johnny Callanan, Dan Devitt, Murt O'Brien, Jim Prior, Mick Williams, Tony Herbert, Liam Cashin, Tom Fahy, Jack Sheedy and Tommy Boland.

A lean period followed, although winning four senior league titles in the interim, Faughs next senior championship success had to wait until 1970. Then they almost won five championships in a row. They beat St. Vincents in Croke Park to win the 1970 title. In May 1971, after a tremendous but gruelling game, they were unlucky to be beaten by one point by Buffers Alley in the Leinster Senior Club Hurling Championship. A few days later, they were knocked out of the Dublin championship, again by a single point margin by Craobh Ciaran who went on to win their first Dublin title.

Faughs won the next two county championships of 1972 and 1973 and reached the final in 1974, which they lost to Kilmacud Crokes by one point. Two senior titles came in the 1980s—1986 and 1987 with Joe Cunningham, Jim Lyng, Richie Reid, M. J. Ryan and the Newman brothers, Martin and P.J. Two more came in the 1990s, 1992 and 1999, to bring the grand total of senior championships won to 31.

From their foundation in 1885 up to 1949, Faughs trained in the Phoenix Park in the Fifteen Acres, Nine Acres, Polo Ground and beside the Hurling Ground or Army Ground, except for a short period in the winter of 1942–1943 when they moved to Dolphin Park. From 1949 to 1958, they leased a ground in St. Anne's Estate in Killester, where they erected their own dressing rooms.

Following serious vandalism of these, they moved back to the Phoenix Park to the original Fifteen Acres of the 1885 period. In 1972, training moved to Terenure College where the team training facilities included the luxury of showers, etc., until finally in 1981, they moved to the ground at Tymon North, Templeogue.

In the early days, club meetings took place at various venues, including Pat Cullen's premises at 27 Upper Ormond Quay, where Dublin County Board and Leinster Council meetings were also held. Later, and for many years, Tommy Moore's premises in Cathedral Street was the home of Faughs. It was also the meeting place for all Gaels from all over Ireland attending matches at Croke Park.

From the early 1960s, Stephen Bourke's premises at 25 Wexford Street became the new home of Faughs. It was here that the plans were laid to build the clubhouse at Tymon North, Templeogue, which was officially opened by Dr. Patrick Hillery, President of Ireland on 30 November 1986.

From the earliest days, Faughs' contribution to Dublin GAA games has been considerable. Pat Cullen was a member of Dublin County Board from 1887, and its treasurer from 1902, a founder member of the Dublin Hurling League 1901 and donor of the Cullen Cup to the League winners. He is believed to have helped financially in the purchase of Croke Park by the G.A.A.

Harry Boland, who was prominent in the 1916 Rising and War of Independence, won senior championships with Faughs in 1914 and 1915. He was chairman of Dublin County Board from 1911 to 1916.

Andy Harty, who won nine championships with Faughs, was county board chairman in 1916–1925.

Jim (Builder) Walsh won three All-Irelands with Dublin, and was the only player selected on all three Tailteann Games (Ireland) teams. He was Chairman of Dublin County Board during 1929–1930.

Tommy Moore was Faughs club chairman for 50 years. The Irish club hurling championship cup is named in his honour. The original cup can be seen in the Croke Park museum.

Pat Farrell, hurling correspondent under the pen-name "P.F." for several decades with the Evening Herald, was chairman of the Dublin Junior Board in 1934–1935, and was also a senior hurling selector for many years.

Faughs Dublin teams won eight Leinster Championships. Bob Mockler captained Faughs to win the 1920 All-Ireland for Dublin. Dublin last All-Ireland win in 1938 included Faughs players Mick Butler, Phil Farrell, Mick Gill, Harry Grey and Charlie Downs. Jim Prior captained Dublin in the 1952 All-Ireland while Mick Kennedy, who got the first score on RTÉ, represented Faughs in Dublin's last All-Ireland final appearance in 1961. Mick Kennedy was a selector during Lar Foley's term as manager in the 1990s.

Honours
 All-Ireland Senior Hurling Championship: Winner 1920
 Leinster Senior Hurling Championship: 1892, 1902, 1906, 1920, 1921
 Dublin Senior Hurling Championship Winners: 1892, 1900, 1901, 1903, 1904, 1906, 1910, 1911, 1914, 1915, 1920, 1921, 1922, 1923, 1930, 1936, 1939, 1940, 1941, 1944, 1945, 1946, 1950, 1952, 1970, 1972, 1973, 1986, 1987, 1992, 1999
 Dublin Senior Hurling League: 1904, 1906, 1910, 1911, 1914, 1915, 1920, 1921, 1922, 1925, 1927, 1930, 1937, 1938, 1939, 1942, 1944, 1946, 1948, 1952, 1953, 1961, 1962, 1966, 1971, 1973, 1986, 1987
 Dublin Senior B Hurling Championship:  2001, 2005, 2018
 Dublin Minor B Hurling Championship Winners 2012, 2016
 Dublin Minor C Hurling Championship Winners 2004, 2008
 Dublin Senior Football Championship Winners: 1889
 Dublin Intermediate Hurling Championship Winners: 1920, 1930, 1987
 Dublin Junior Hurling Championship Winners: 1898, 1944, 1947, 1984, 1999, 2007
 Dublin Junior C Hurling Championship Winners 2000, 2012

References

External links
Faughs Website
Dublin GAA Website
Dublin Club GAA

Templeogue
Gaelic games clubs in South Dublin (county)
Hurling clubs in South Dublin (county)
Camogie clubs in County Dublin